Trouble is the first studio album by English electronic musician and producer Totally Enormous Extinct Dinosaurs (credited as Orlando Higginbottom), released on 8 June 2012 by Polydor Records.

Track listing

Personnel
Adapted from the album's liner notes.

 Orlando Higginbottom – writing, instruments, programming, vocals 

Other musicians
 Edmund Finnis – writing , guitar , synth , Rhodes piano , vocals 
 Luisa Gerstein – writing , vocals 
 G. Clinton – writing, elements ("One Nation under a Groove") 
 G. Shider – writing, elements 
 W. Morrison – writing, elements  
 Robin McDiarmid – guitar 
 Yolanda – vocals 
 Sam Scott – trumpet 

 Stuart Hawkes – mastering

Artwork and design
 Orlando Higginbottom – art direction
 Mat Maitland – art direction, design
 Stephanie Sian Smith – photography
 Marc Sethi – studio image
 Jethro Buck – additional collage
 Yunus & Eliza – headpiece on front cover 
 Swarovski – elements for headpiece

Charts

Release history

References

External links
 

2012 debut albums
Albums produced by Totally Enormous Extinct Dinosaurs
Polydor Records albums
Totally Enormous Extinct Dinosaurs albums